Lamelas is a Hispanic surname that may refer to the following notable people:
David Lamelas (born 1946), Argentinian artist
Diego Lamelas (born 1972), Uruguayan rugby union player
Diogo Lamelas (born 1990), Portuguese football forward
Lazaro Lamelas Ramirez (born 1974), Cuban artistic gymnast

See also
Lamela (surname)

Spanish-language surnames